Rothalpy (or trothalpy) , a short name of rotational stagnation enthalpy, is a fluid mechanical property of importance in the study of flow within rotating systems.

Concept 
Consider we have an inertial frame of reference  and a rotating frame of reference  which both are sharing common origin . Assume that frame  is rotating around a fixed axis with angular velocity . Now assuming fluid velocity to be  and fluid velocity relative to rotating frame of reference to be :

Rothalpy of a fluid point  can be defined as

and is known as relative stagnation enthalpy.

Rothalpy can also be defined in terms of absolute stagnation enthalpy:

where  is tangential component of fluid velocity .

Applications 
Rothalpy has applications in turbomachinery and study of relative flows in rotating systems.

One such application is that for steady, adiabatic and irreversible flow in a turbomachine, the value of rothalpy across a blade remains constant along a flow streamline:

so Euler equation of turbomachinery can be written in terms of rothalpy.

This form of the Euler work equation shows that, for rotating blade rows, the relative stagnation enthalpy is constant through the blades provided the blade speed is constant. In other words, if the radius of a streamline passing through the blades stays the same. This result is important for analyzing turbomachinery flows in the relative frame of reference.

Naming 
The function  was first introduced by Wu (1952) and has acquired the widely used name rothalpy.

This quantity is commonly called rothalpy, a compound word combining the terms rotation and enthalpy. However, its construction does not conform to the established rules for formation of new words in the English language, namely, that the roots of the new word originate from the same language. The word trothalpy satisfies this requirement as trohos is the Greek root for wheel and enthalpy is to put heat in, whereas rotation is derived from Latin rotare.

See also 

 Stagnation enthalpy
 Euler's pump and turbine equation

References 

Fluid dynamics
Enthalpy